Periclytus, a sculptor, who belonged to the best period and to one of the best schools of Greek art, but of whom scarcely any thing is known. He is only mentioned in a single passage of Pausanias (v. 17. § 4), from which we learn that he was the disciple of  Polykleitos, and the teacher of Antiphanes of Argos, who  was the teacher of Cleon of Sicyon. Since Polycleitus flourished about b. c. 440, and Antiphanes about b. c. 400, the date of Periclytus may be fixed at about 420 BC.

References

5th-century BC Greek sculptors